Frederick Alfred Robert King (19 September 1919 – 20 May 2003) was an English footballer who played in the Football League for Northampton Town and Wolverhampton Wanderers.

References

1919 births
2003 deaths
Footballers from Northampton
English footballers
Association football forwards
Northampton Town F.C. players
Wolverhampton Wanderers F.C. players
Rushden Town F.C. players
English Football League players